L1448-IRS2E is an object located in LDN 1448, being part of the Perseus molecular cloud.  A clump of dense gas and dust, L1448-IRS2E is one-tenth as luminous as the Sun and thus is unlikely to be a true protostar at this time.  However, its density is high enough that it is ejecting streams of matter from itself, and so it is a likely candidate for the first discovered core in hydrostatic quasi-equilibrium.  This would mean that L1448-IRS2E represents an early phase in stellar development which has so far remained unobserved due to the short time that a star spends in this phase and the low luminosity which comes from a star not yet developed past it.

References

External links
 
 Astronomers Witness A Star Being Born
 Astronomers witness a star being born

Perseus (constellation)
Protostars